Adenium obesum is a poisonous species of flowering plant belonging to the tribe Nerieae of the subfamily Apocynoideae of the dogbane family, Apocynaceae. It is native to the Sahel regions south of the Sahara (from Mauritania and Senegal to Sudan), tropical and subtropical eastern and southern Africa and also the Arabian Peninsula. Common names include Sabi star, kudu, mock azalea, impala lily and desert rose.  Adenium obesum is a popular houseplant and bonsai in temperate regions.

Description

It is an evergreen or drought-deciduous succulent shrub (which can also lose its leaves during cold spells, or according to the subspecies or cultivar). The flowers tend to be red and pink, often with a whitish blush outward of the throat.

Taxonomy

Some taxonomies consider some other species in the genus to be subspecies of Adenium obesum.

Subspecies
 Adenium obesum subsp. oleifolium (South Africa, Botswana)
 Adenium obesum subsp. socotranum (Socotra)
 Adenium obesum subsp. somalense (Eastern Africa)
 Adenium obesum subsp. swazicum (Eswatini, South Africa)

Adenium swazicum is a critically endangered African species native to Eswatini and Mozambique, growing up to 0.7 m (2.29 ft) tall.

Adenium somalense is also native to Africa, inhabiting Tanzania, Kenya, and Somalia, and reaching heights of 5 m (16.40 ft), which makes it the largest of these four subspecies.

Adenium socotranum is native exclusively to the island of Socotra, and can grow to be 4.6 m (15 ft), but despite its small range, it is of least concern regarding endangerment.

Adenium oleifolium is near threatened in the wild and is the smallest of these subspecies, growing at the tallest to 0.4 m (1.31 ft).

Ecology
Caterpillars of the polka-dot wasp moth (Syntomeida epilais) are known to feed on the desert rose, along with feeding on oleanders.

In areas with year-round warm weather, they can bloom throughout the year.

Uses
Adenium obesum produces a sap in its roots and stems that contains cardiac glycosides. This sap is used as arrow poison for hunting large game throughout much of Africa and as a fish toxin.

Cultivation

Adenium obesum is a popular houseplant and bonsai in temperate regions. It thrives on a xeric watering regime as required by cacti. A. obesum is typically propagated by seed or stem cuttings. The numerous hybrids are propagated mainly by grafting on to seedling rootstock. While plants grown from seed are more likely to have the swollen caudex at a young age, with time many cutting-grown plants cannot be distinguished from seed-grown plants. Like many plants, Adenium obesum can also be propagated in vitro using plant tissue culture.

This plant has gained the Royal Horticultural Society's Award of Garden Merit.

Symbolic and cultural references
The species has been depicted on postage stamps issued by various countries.

See also
 List of poisonous plants

Gallery

References

External links
 
 

obesum
Flora of Africa
Flora of the Arabian Peninsula
Plants described in 1819
Garden plants of Africa
Drought-tolerant plants
House plants
Caudiciform plants
Poisonous plants
Plants that can bloom all year round